Henry LeBlanc is an American actor with credits including Scrubs, Law & Order and Everybody Loves Raymond. He also frequently appeared on the Jay Leno Show.  In addition, he teaches an acting course at UCLA Extension.

Filmography

Film

Television

References

External links

Living people
20th-century American male actors
21st-century American male actors
American male film actors
American male television actors
Place of birth missing (living people)
Year of birth missing (living people)